The 1973 Daytona 500, the 15th running of the event, was won by Richard Petty on February 18, 1973, at Daytona International Raceway in Daytona Beach, Florida.

Four cautions slowed the race for 28 laps. A crowd of over one hundred thousand  came to see a field of 38 American and two Canadians (Earl Ross and Vic Parsons). Bobby Isaac would finish second to Richard Petty by more than two laps.

Both Hollar and Jett participated in qualifying and were supposed to start in the 125s (Hollar was supposed to start 38th in race 1 and Jett was supposed to start 26th in race 2), but for whatever reason neither driver ended up participating.

Background

Daytona International Speedway is a race track in Daytona Beach, Florida, that is one of six superspeedways to hold NASCAR races, the others being Michigan International Speedway, Auto Club Speedway, Indianapolis Motor Speedway, Pocono Raceway and Talladega Superspeedway. The track also features two other layouts that utilize portions of the primary high speed tri-oval, such as a  sports car course and a  motorcycle course. The track's  infield includes the  Lake Lloyd, which has hosted powerboat racing. The speedway is owned and operated by International Speedway Corporation.

The track was built by NASCAR founder Bill France Sr. to host racing that was being held at the former Daytona Beach Road Course and opened with the first Daytona 500 in 1959. The speedway has been renovated three times, with the infield renovated in 2004, and the track repaved in 1978 and 2010.

The Daytona 500 is regarded as the most important and prestigious race on the NASCAR calendar. It is also the series' first race of the year; this phenomenon is virtually unique in sports, which tend to have championships or other major events at the end of the season rather than the start. Since 1995, U.S. television ratings for the Daytona 500 have been the highest for any auto race of the year, surpassing the traditional leader, the Indianapolis 500 which in turn greatly surpasses the Daytona 500 in in-track attendance and international viewing. The 2006 Daytona 500 attracted the sixth largest average live global TV audience of any sporting event that year with 20 million viewers.

Speedweeks
32-year-old Buddy Baker believed it was finally his year. He had won the pole (see above), and in the first Twin 125 race, Baker fought off the effects of an ear infection and beat Cale Yarborough, 1968 champion of the Daytona 500, in a sprinted duel. In that first race, a 26-year-old Tennessee rookie named Darrell Waltrip, had one of the most impressive runs. Driving his own 1971 Mercury, Waltrip finished sixth and captured the eleventh starting spot for his first 500.

Another Tennessee driver stole the spotlight that day, Coo Coo Marlin, a 41-year-old journeyman whose best finish in four previous 500s was 18th, shocked the crowd by passing David Pearson with 6 laps to go to win the second twin 125. Richard Petty finished fourth in the first Twin 125 and was not happy with his Dodge until his crew made major suspension changes the day before the race.

Race Summary
Race morning dawned gray and rainy. Similar to the 1979 race, the race was started under caution and began with 13 laps under yellow to have the cars help dry the track. Once under green Baker led the first 33 laps as Yarborough, Petty, Issac, and Pearson clung tenaciously to him. Petty lead for the first time on lap 37. But as the race continued, Baker took over. He took the lead from Issac on lap 40 and led 17 circuits. Then he led laps 71 through 102 before Yarborough squeezed past. But Baker took over again on lap 109.

By this time, Petty was out of sequence with the field. he cut a right rear tire on lap 88 and was forced to the pits. he lost a lap. He would make up the lap when the leaders pitted, but lose it when he pitted again.

With 50 laps to go, Baker was in front. He had dominated, leading 119 of the first 150 circuits, even as Yarborough stubbornly hung with him. As usual, engine problems took their toll. Pete Hamilton the 1970 winner who had qualified second, was first out on lap 33. David Pearson's engine expired after 63 laps. Bobby Allison and Coo Coo Marlin's engines also blew.

On lap 155, John Utsman's engine blew and he spun just past the finish line. Petty was back on the lead lap with Baker, but about to head for the pits. Petty just missed the spinning car. The yellow flag gave Petty another break. It allowed him to pit with Baker and remain on the lead lap. Meanwhile, Yarborough's engine quit during the caution period. He was out of the race. Yarborough had led six times for 25 laps and his spirited challenge of Baker had kept the fans entertained all afternoon.

Now it was down to Petty and Baker. They were the only drivers still on the lead lap. Baker led laps 165 through 184, but both drivers needed one more quick stop for fuel. Petty came in first. He waited until the last moment before diving off turn four on lap 189 and screamed into his pit. Petty's car spewed tire smoke as he slid to a perfect stop. Five gallons and 8.4 seconds later, Petty was on his way.

Baker came in the next lap. He did not enter the pits as quickly. His stop took 9.9 seconds. When both cars reached full speed, Petty had a 4.4-second lead. Baker immediately began closing the gap. With six laps remaining, he was only 2.5 seconds behind. Suddenly, Baker's engine blew. It was over.

Petty won his fourth Daytona 500, he would win three more. Waltrip finished his first 500 in 12th. His first and only Daytona 500 win didn't come until 1989.

First Daytona 500 starts for Hershel McGriff, Darrell Waltrip, Ed Negre, John Utsman, Marty Robbins, and Earl Ross. Only Daytona 500 starts for Vic Parsons and Larry Smith. Last Daytona 500 starts for Jabe Thomas, Ray Elder, Ron Keselowski, Maynard Troyer, John Sears, Red Farmer, Tiny Lund, Neil Castles, Gordon Johncock, and Pete Hamilton.

Top 10 finishers

References

Daytona 500
Daytona 500
Daytona 500
NASCAR races at Daytona International Speedway